Smelly may refer to something with a disagreeable odor (i.e., something that smells bad). Smelly may also refer to:

People
Smelly (performer) or Dai Okazaki, a Japanese comedic performer
Erik Sandin, drummer with NOFX nicknamed Smelly

See also
Smelley, a surname